This bibliography of John F. Kennedy is a list of published works about John F. Kennedy, the 35th president of the United States.

Biographical

 
 
 
 
 

 
 
 Casey, Shaun. The Making of a Catholic President: Kennedy vs. Nixon 1960 (2009)
 
 
 Collier, Peter & Horowitz, David. The Kennedys (1984)
 Cottrell, John. Assassination! The World Stood Still (1964)
 
 
 
 
 
 Fay, Paul B., Jr. The Pleasure of His Company (1966)
 Giglio, James. The Presidency of John F. Kennedy (1991)
 
 Hamilton, Nigel. JFK: Reckless Youth (1992)
 Harper, Paul, and Krieg, Joann P. eds. John F. Kennedy: The Promise Revisited (1988)
 Harris, Seymour E. The Economics of the Political Parties, with Special Attention to Presidents Eisenhower and Kennedy (1962)
 Heath, Jim F. Decade of Disillusionment: The Kennedy–Johnson Years (1976)
 Hersh, Seymour. The Dark Side of Camelot (1997)
 
 Hodgson, Godfrey. JFK and LBJ: The Last Two Great Presidents (Yale UP, 2015) excerpt

 

 
 
 Logevall, Fredrik. JFK: Coming of Age in the American Century, 1917-1956 (Random House, 2020)

 
 
 Manchester, William. Portrait of a President, John F. Kennedy in profile (1962, 1967)
 
 Parmet, Herbert. Jack: The Struggles of John F. Kennedy (1980)
 Parmet, Herbert. JFK: The Presidency of John F. Kennedy (1983)
 Parmet, Herbert. "The Kennedy Myth". In Myth America: A Historical Anthology, Volume II. Gerster, Patrick, and Cords, Nicholas. (editors.) (1997)
 Piper, Michael Collins. Final Judgment (2004: sixth edition). American Free Press
 
 
 Reeves, Thomas. A Question of Character: A Life of John F. Kennedy (1991); hostile biography
 Sabato, Larry J. The Kennedy Half-Century: The Lasting Legacy of John F. Kennedy (forthcoming, 2013)
  
 
 Selverstone, Marc J., ed. A Companion to John F. Kennedy (Wiley-Blackwell, 2014)
 
 
 Whalen, Thomas J. JFK and His Enemies: A Portrait of Power (2014)

Foreign policy

 Andrew, Christopher (1995). For the President's Eyes Only: Secret Intelligence and the American Presidency from Washington to Bush. pp. 257-306.
 Angelo, Anne-Marie, and Tom Adam Davies. "'American Business can Assist [African] Hands:' The Kennedy Administration, U.S. Corporations, and the Cold War Struggle for Africa." The Sixties 8.2 (2015): 156-178.
 Beschloss, Michael R. The Crisis Years: Kennedy and Khrushchev, 1960-1963 (1991)
 Brinkley, Douglas, and Richard T. Griffiths, eds. John F. Kennedy and Europe (1999) essays by experts.
 Busch, Peter. All the Way With JFK? Britain, the US, and the Vietnam War (2003). 
 Colman, Jonathan (2015). "The 'Bowl of Jelly': The U.S. Department of State during the Kennedy and Johnson Years, 1961-1968." Hague Journal of Diplomacy, vol. 10, no. 2, pp. 172-196.
 Cull, Nicholas J. "'The Man Who Invented Truth': The Tenure of Edward R. Murrow as Director of the United States Information Agency During the Kennedy Years." Cold War History 4.1 (2003): 23-48.
 David, Andrew, and Michael Holm. "The Kennedy Administration and the Battle Over Foreign Aid: The Untold Story of the Clay Committee." Diplomacy & Statecraft, vol. 27, no. 1 (2016): 65-92.
 Dean, Robert D. "Masculinity as ideology: John F. Kennedy and the domestic politics of foreign policy." Diplomatic History 22.1 (1998): 29-62.
 Dunne, Michael. "Kennedy's Alliance for Progress: Countering Revolution in Latin America, Part II: The Historiographical Record." International Affairs, vol. 92, no. 2 (2016): 435-452.
 Field, Thomas C. From Development to Dictatorship: Bolivia and the Alliance for Progress in the Kennedy Era (2014)
 Freedman, Lawrence. Kennedy's Wars: Berlin, Cuba, Laos and Vietnam (2000)
 Fursenko, Aleksandr and Timothy Naftali. One Hell of a Gamble: Khrushchev, Castro and Kennedy, 1958–1964 (1997)
 Gavin, Francis J. Gold, Dollars, and Power: The Politics of International Monetary Relations, 1958-1971 (2007)
 Gioe, David, and Len Scott, Christopher Andrew, eds. An International History of the Cuban Missile Crisis (2014), essays by scholars. 
 Giglio, James N. The Presidency of John F. Kennedy (2006). 
 Gleijeses, Piero. "Ships in the Night: The CIA, the White House and the Bay of Pigs." Journal of Latin American Studies (1995) 27#1  1–42
 Hilsman, Roger. To Move a Nation: The Politics of Foreign Policy in the Administration of John F. Kennedy (1967).
 Hurley, Christopher John. The Imperial Imperative: John F Kennedy and US Foreign Relations. (Master of Research (MRes) thesis, University of Kent, 2018)  online 
 Hybel, A. US Foreign Policy Decision-making from Truman to Kennedy: Responses to International Challenges (Springer, 2016).
 Jones, Howard. The Bay of Pigs (2008)
 Jones, Howard. The Lost Chance for Peace and the Escalation of War in Vietnam (2003)
 Kaufman, Burton I. "John F. Kennedy as world leader: A perspective on the literature." Diplomatic History 17.3 (1993): 447-470.
 Kempe, Frederick. Berlin 1961: Kennedy, Khrushchev, and the most dangerous place on earth (2011).
 Kunz, Diane B. The Diplomacy of the Crucial Decade: American Foreign Relations during the 1960s (1994)

 Logevall, Fredrik, The Lost Chance for Peace and the Escalation of War in Vietnam (1999).
 Lynch, Grayston L. Decision for Disaster Betrayal at the Bay of Pigs (2000)
 McKercher, Asa. Camelot and Canada: Canadian-American Relations in the Kennedy Era (Oxford UP, 2016).
 Muehlenbeck, Philip Emil. Betting on the Africans: John F. Kennedy's courting of African nationalist leaders (Oxford University Press, 2012).
 Newman, John M. JFK and Vietnam: Deception, Intrigue, and the Struggle for Power (1992)
 Newmann, William W. "Searching for the Right Balance? Managing Foreign Policy Decisions under Eisenhower and Kennedy." Congress & the Presidency 42#2  (2015).
 O'Brien, Michael. John F. Kennedy: A Biography (2005).
 Pelz, Stephen E. "“When Do I Have Time to Think?” John F. Kennedy, Roger Hilsman, and the Laotian Crisis of 1962." Diplomatic History 3.2 (1979): 215-230.
 Paterson, Thomas G., ed. Kennedy's Quest for Victory: American Foreign Policy, 1961-1963 (1989). 
 Powaski, Ronald E. "John F. Kennedy, the Hawks, the Doves, and the Cuban Missile Crisis, 1962." in American Presidential Statecraft (2017) pp. 11-65.
 Rabe, Stephen G.  The Most Dangerous Area in the World: John F. Kennedy Confronts Communist Revolution in Latin America (1999).
 Rakove, Robert B.  Kennedy, Johnson and the Nonaligned World (2013) 
 Rizas, Sotiris. "Formulating a policy towards Eastern Europe on the eve of Détente: The USA, the Allies and Bridge Building, 1961–1964." Journal of Transatlantic Studies 12.1 (2014): 18-40.
 Schaffer, Howard B. Chester Bowles: New Dealer in the Cold War (1993) 
 Schlesinger, Arthur M. Jr A Thousand Days: John F. Kennedy in the White House (1965)
 Schoenbaum, Thomas J. Waging Peace and War: Dean Rusk in the Truman, Kennedy and Johnson Years (1988)
 Selverstone, Marc J. "Eternal Flaming: The Historiography of Kennedy Foreign Policy." Passport: The Newsletter of the SHAFR, vol. 46, no. 1 (April 2015), pp 22–29.
 Selverstone, Marc J., ed. A Companion to John F. Kennedy (2014). Emphasis on historiography.
 Sergunin, Alexander. "John F. Kennedy’s Decision-Making on the Berlin Crisis of 1961." Review of History and Political Science, vol. 2, no. 1 (2014): 1-27.  online
 Shields, David. Kennedy and Macmillan: Cold War Politics (2006) excerpt
 Shapley, Deborah. Promise and Power: The Life and Times of Robert McNamara (1993)
 Simpson, Bradley. Economists with Guns: Authoritarian Development and U.S.-Indonesian Relations 1960-1968 (2008)
 Taffet, Jeffrey J. Foreign Aid as Foreign Policy: The Alliance for Progress in Latin America (2007)
 Tucker, Spencer. The Encyclopedia of the Vietnam War: A Political, Social, and Military History (1998)
 Walton, Richard J. Cold War and Counterrevolution: The Foreign Policy of John F. Kennedy(1972).
 Wenger, Andreas, and Marcel Gerber. "John F. Kennedy and the Limited Test Ban Treaty: A Case Study of Presidential Leadership." Presidential Studies Quarterly, vol. 29, no. 2 (1999): 460-487.

Historiography and memory
 Abramson, Jill. "Kennedy, the Elusive President." New York Times Book Review (October 22, 2013).
 Notes that thus far about 40,000 books have been published about JFK.
 Brandimarte, Cynthia A. "Review: The Sixth Floor: John F. Kennedy and the Memory of a Nation," Journal of American History 78#1 (1991), pp. 268-274 online

 Craig, Campbell. "Kennedy's International Legacy, Fifty Years On." International Affairs, vol. 89, no. 6 (2013): 1367-1378. . 
 Eder, Elizabeth. "Memory of a Nation: Effectively Using Artworks to Teach about the Assassination of President John F. Kennedy" Social Education (November/December 2011), pp. 296-300.  online
 George, Alice. The assassination of John F. Kennedy: political trauma and American memory (Routledge, 2012).
 Gunzenhäuser, Randi. "History, and the Assassination of John F. Kennedy" Amerikastudien/ American Studies 43#1 (1998), pp. 75-91 online

 Hellmann, John (1997). The Kennedy Obsession: The American Myth of JFK. .
 Kazin, Michael (December 2017). "An Idol and Once a President: John F. Kennedy at 100." Journal of American History, 104#3 pp. 707–726. ..
 Kitch, Carolyn. " 'A death in the American family': Myth, memory, and national values in the media mourning of John F. Kennedy Jr." Journalism & Mass Communication Quarterly 79.2 (2002): 294-309.
 Knott, Stephen F. Coming to Terms with John F. Kennedy (2022) excerpt

 Santa Cruz, Paul H. Making JFK Matter: Popular Memory and the 35th President. Denton: University of North Texas Press (2015).
 Selverstone, Marc J., ed. A Companion to John F. Kennedy. Wiley-Blackwell (2014). . Topical essays by scholars focusing on historiography.
 Ulyatt, Michelle.  "The John F. Kennedy Presidential Library and Museum as a cultural representation of the public memory of the president" European Journal of American Culture, 33#2 (2014), pp. 117-130. DOI: https://doi.org/10.1386/ejac.33.2.117_1

Primary sources

 
 Goldzwig, Steven R. and Dionisopoulos, George N., eds. In a Perilous Hour: The Public Address of John F. Kennedy (1995)
 Kennedy, Jacqueline. Jacqueline Kennedy: Historic Conversations on Life with John F. Kennedy (2011). Hyperion Books. .
 
 McNamara, Robert. In retrospect: The tragedy and lessons of Vietnam (2017).

Kennedy, John F.
Kennedy, John F.
Political bibliographies
Bibliographies of people
John F. Kennedy-related lists